Michael Quintero Aguilar (born July 11, 1980) is a Colombian professional tennis player. 

Quintero reached a career high ATP singles ranking of world No,. 245, achieved on 12 November 2007. He also reached a career high ATP doubles ranking of world No. 231, achieved on 27 October 2008.

Quintero won eight tournaments in Colombia, Jamaica and Cuba. Quintero represented Colombia in Rio 2007 Pan American Games where he got to the semifinals where he lost against Chilean Adrián García, then Quintero lost the bronze medal match against Argentine Eduardo Schwank. He represents Team Colombia while competing in the Davis Cup.

Quintero has reached 28 career singles finals with a record of 10 wins and 18 losses, which includes a record of 0–1 in ATP Challenger Tour finals. Additionally, he has reached 33 career doubles finals with a record of 14 wins and 19 losses, which includes a 1–4 record in ATP Challenger Tour finals.

ATP Challenger and ITF Futures finals

Singles: 28 (10–18)

Doubles: 33 (14–19)

References

Colombian male tennis players
Sportspeople from Medellín
1980 births
Living people
Pan American Games competitors for Colombia
Central American and Caribbean Games medalists in tennis
Central American and Caribbean Games gold medalists for Colombia
Central American and Caribbean Games bronze medalists for Colombia
Tennis players at the 2007 Pan American Games
Tennis players at the 2003 Pan American Games
21st-century Colombian people